The Surgères 48 hour race is perhaps the most significant event in the current ultrarunning calendar in this time-frame. Begun in 1985 with the inspiration of Jean-Gilles Boussiquet it takes place in Surgères, France. An invitation only event, it has been host to many world records at the 48 hour distance.

The competition did not take place in 1999 and since 2011.

External links
Surgères 48 Hour Race at multidayWiki
The winners and records (1985-2005)

Multiday races
Ultramarathons in France
Recurring sporting events established in 1985
Recurring events disestablished in 2010
1985 establishments in France